Lawrence Joseph Peat (29 August 192816 March 2018) was a Church of England priest who was Archdeacon of Westmorland and Furness from 1989 until 1995.

Education and career 

Initially, Peat was unsure whether to take up ordained ministry. However, eventually, he was educated at Lincoln Theological College and ordained in 1958. After a curacy at Bramley he served incumbencies in Stockport, Leeds, Southend-on-Sea, Longsleddale and  Kirkby Lonsdale.

Retirement 

Peat attended St Mary's Church, Whitkirk, Leeds, where his youngest son is the Priest in Charge. He preached there for sung Sunday morning Eucharists on several occasions.

Peat died on 16 March 2018.

References
 

 

1928 births
2018 deaths
Alumni of Lincoln Theological College
Archdeacons of Westmorland and Furness